Caroline Ann Kovac is an American chemist, technologist, executive, and consultant.

Kovac initiated the computational life sciences division at IBM in 1999. She retired from IBM in 2007, having grown the division to over 1500 people globally.

Education 
By Kovac's own account, she was "one of the first" in her family to attend and graduate from university, Oberlin College. She obtained a Ph.D. from the University of Southern California in 1981.

Career 
From 1981 to 1983, Kovac was employed as a chemist working on carbon-based materials. Kovac was employed at IBM from 1983 to 2002. She initially entered the company as a bench chemist, specializing in fine-contact metallurgy, packaging, and mainframe computer components at the San Jose Research laboratory (later IBM Almaden). Kovac would later take roles in various other segments of IBM, to include manufacturing, supply-chain management, software, and multiple stints in IBM Research. She was named VP of Research from 1997-2000.

In 2004, the New York Times profiled Kovac's division as it ventured into distributed computing power to solve structures for the Human Proteome Folding Project. She was also a founding member of the National Geographic Genographic Project to track human migration across the centuries using DNA sequencing and data analysis.

Kovac is a member-emerita of the IBM Academy of Technology.

Awards 

 2004 - Forbes '50 Most Powerful Women in Business'
 2003 - Stevie Award finalist, Best CEO or COO
 2003 - Turing Talk from the British Computer Society
 2002 - Women in Technology Hall of Fame inductee

References 

Living people
Year of birth missing (living people)
American women chemists
20th-century American businesswomen
20th-century American businesspeople
IBM employees
Oberlin College alumni
University of Southern California alumni
21st-century American women